Cláudia Silva may refer to:
 Cláudia da Silva, Brazilian volleyball player
 Claudia Silva (actress), Mexican actress and writer

See also
 Claudio Silva (disambiguation)